Seema Yasmin is a British-American physician, writer and science communicator based at Stanford University. She is Director of Research and Education at the Stanford Health Communication Initiative. During the COVID-19 pandemic, Yasmin helped to debunk myths about the coronavirus.

Education and early career 
Yasmin was born in Nuneaton, Warwickshire, England and raised in London to a family of Indian and Burmese ancestry.  Her mother, Yasmin Halima, was born in India and is a Distinguished Careers Institute fellow who works on women's health. At the age of seventeen, Yasmin decided that she wanted to take her mother's first name as her surname, and had her name changed with a lawyer. Yasmin trained in biochemistry at Queen Mary University of London and graduated in 2005. She moved to the University of Cambridge to complete a graduate programme in medicine. She started her medical career in the National Health Service, working at Homerton University Hospital for one year. In 2010 Yasmin was awarded a University of California, Los Angeles fellowship to train in clinical research in Botswana. She moved to the United States with her mother. In 2011, Yasmin joined the Epidemic Intelligence Service as a "disease detective" at the United States Centers for Disease Control and Prevention, where she studied outbreaks of disease in prisons, border towns and American Indian reservations. Whilst studying an outbreak of flesh-eating bacteria on the Navajo Nation, Yasmin realised the power of effective science communication, and realised that she wanted to use journalism to shift public policy.

Career 
In 2013 Yasmin was made a Dalla Lana Global Journalism Fellow at the University of Toronto. Here she focussed on telling the stories of epidemics in an effort to encourage others to learn from tragedy. Soon after completing her fellowship, Yasmin joined The Dallas Morning News as a reporter. Her work there included coverage of the Ebola crisis in Dallas and the epidemic of gun violence in the US. She was a medical analyst for CNN, and had a weekly medical segment on television news partner NBC 5 DFW. She held a simultaneous position as Professor of Public Health at the University of Texas at Dallas. Yasmin delivered the 2016 University of Texas at Austin McGovern Lecture, where she discussed the lessons she had learned reporting from public health emergencies.

Yasmin joined Stanford University as a John S. Knight Fellow in 2017. There she investigated the spread of misinformation and pseudoscience during epidemics. As part of this fellowship, Yasmin started working with Wired to debunk pseudoscience and misinformation on YouTube. She delivered a talk at the TEDx OakLawn event in 2018. In 2019 Yasmin was appointed as Director of the Stanford University Health Communication Initiative.

During the COVID-19 pandemic, Yasmin used social media, podcasts, and popular science articles to better inform the public about the coronavirus disease. She is also interested in the "spread of myths and hoaxes and rumors and outright lies about vaccines". Yasmin became one of the most trusted public health experts on social media. She used webinars to teach students about how to report responsibly on medical emergencies. In an interview with Bumble, Yasmin explained how to date during the pandemic. A collection of her essays on health and medical misinformation from her newspaper column “Debunked” was published in 2021 as Viral BS : medical myths and why we fall for them.

Her second book, Muslim Women Are Everything, started as a conversation on Twitter and ended as a six-figure book deal.

Selected publications

Peer-reviewed scientific papers

Selected works 

 The Impatient Dr. Lange: One Man's Fight to End the Global HIV Epidemic,  
 
 
 
Yasmin, Seema (2021). Viral BS : medical myths and why we fall for them. .

Awards and honours 
 2016 University of North Texas Mayborn Award for Literary Non-Fiction
 2016 won an Emmy Award for her documentary Hidden Threat: The Kissing Bug and Chagas Disease
 2017 John S. Knight Fellow in Journalism.
 2017 Pulitzer Prize Finalist.

References 

Living people
21st-century British medical doctors
Year of birth missing (living people)
Science communicators
Alumni of the University of Cambridge
Alumni of Queen Mary University of London
Stanford University faculty
English people of Indian descent
English people of Burmese descent
English Muslims
People from London
People from Nuneaton